Jay Rogers Benton  (October 18, 1885 – November 4, 1953) was an American lawyer, businessman, and politician who served as Massachusetts Attorney General from 1923 to 1927. He was born in Somerville in 1885.

The son of Republican politician Everett Chamberlin Benton, Benton worked as a banker, newspaper publisher, and lawyer before pursuing a career in politics.  Benton was elected to the Massachusetts House of Representatives in 1917, but resigned the following year to become Assistant Attorney General of Massachusetts. When Attorney General J. Weston Allen decided not to run for reelection in 1922, Benton was elected to succeed him.

From 1937 until his death in 1953, Benton was president of the Boston Mutual Life Insurance Company. He died in Belmont, Massachusetts in 1953.

References

1885 births
1953 deaths
Boston University School of Law alumni
Harvard University alumni
Phillips Exeter Academy alumni
Massachusetts Attorneys General
Members of the Massachusetts House of Representatives
People from Belmont, Massachusetts
Politicians from Somerville, Massachusetts
20th-century American politicians